Melanthera fauriei (formerly Lipochaeta fauriei),  known by the common name Olokele Canyon nehe, is a rare species of flowering plant in the aster family.

Distribution
The plant is endemic to Hawaii, where it is known only from the island of Kauai.

It grows in several types of forest on Kauai, and can be found in dry, moist, and wet habitat.

Description
Melanthera fauriei is sprawling perennial herb.

It produces daisylike yellow flower heads.

Conservation
Melanthera fauriei is federally listed as an endangered species of the United States. There are only ten populations remaining, with a total global population of no more than 240 plants.

The main threat to the species is the loss and degradation of its habitat caused by deer, goats, rats, wild boars, fires, landslides, and invasive plant species.

References

External links
USDA Plants Profile for Melanthera fauriei

fauriei
Endemic flora of Hawaii
Biota of Kauai